Marcelo Miranda Viana da Silva (born 4 March 1962) is a Brazilian mathematician working in dynamical systems theory.

He was a Guggenheim Fellow in 1993. He received the TWAS Prize in 1998 and in 2005 he was awarded the inaugural ICTP Ramanujan Prize for his research achievements.

Viana was vice-president of the International Mathematical Union in 2011–2014, and president of the Brazilian Mathematical Society (2013–2015).

In 1998, he was a plenary speaker at the International Congress of Mathematicians, in Berlin.

Viana is director elected of the IMPA (for the period 2016–2019).

Viana is a columnist for Folha de S.Paulo.

He is the chair of the executive committee for the 2018 International Congress of Mathematicians, Rio de Janeiro.

Biography 
Viana was born in Rio de Janeiro, Brazil, his parents being Portuguese. He grew up in Portugal, and his undergraduate studies were at the University of Porto. He received his Ph.D. degree from the IMPA in Rio de Janeiro, with Jacob Palis as advisor. He is now director at IMPA.

Work 

Viana's work concerns chaotic dynamical systems and strange attractors.

Selected publications 
 jointly with AVILA, A., "Simplicity of Lyapunov spectra: proof of the Zorich–Kontsevich conjecture". Acta Mathematica. vol. 198 (2007), no. 1, pp. 1–56.
 jointly with PALIS, J., "High dimension diffeomorphisms displaying infinitely many periodic attractors". Annals of Mathematics. vol. 140 (1994), no. 1, pp. 207–250.
 jointly with MORA, L., "Abundance of strange attractors". Acta Mathematica. vol. 171 (1993), no. 1, pp. 1–71.

References

External links 
 Home page of Marcelo Viana
 Unión Matemática de América Latina y el Caribe – UMALCA Award in Mathematics 2000: Marcelo Viana
 
 Viana teaching a course on ordinary differential equations (in Portuguese)
 Interview with Marcelo Viana, conducted by Maria Manuel Clementino and Jorge Picado

1962 births
Living people
University of Porto alumni
Members of the Brazilian Academy of Sciences
Dynamical systems theorists
Instituto Nacional de Matemática Pura e Aplicada alumni
Instituto Nacional de Matemática Pura e Aplicada researchers
20th-century Brazilian mathematicians
21st-century Brazilian mathematicians
TWAS laureates